Euselasia is a genus of butterflies in the family Riodinidae. They are present only in the Neotropical realm. The genus was erected by Jacob Hübner in 1819.

Description
The wing veins are inconstant. Some species have two, others three, and one species (E. aurantiaca) even four subcostal branches. The genus is recognizable by the anterior radial vein either running directly in the elongation of the subcostal, or being connected with it by a very short anterior discocellular.

The butterflies often have the appearance of small satyrids or Thecla species; as for instance Euselasia eutychus resembles (particularly beneath) exactly Euptychia helle flying in the same locality, or Thecla themathea; or Euselasia clithra resembles Euptychia chloris and so on. On the upper surface there is often a very bright reflection of a shining power otherwise not found in any lepidopteran and of a truly wonderful iridescence.

The larvae are somewhat of the shape of a woodlouse, very brightly coloured, behind the head there are two points. The pupae are covered with fine, fluffy hairs like the larvae, green, held by a belt. The imagines are partly extraordinarily rare and belong to the few Riodinidae that fly to a considerable height. They also clap their wings together when at rest like other day butterflies, unlike most of the other Riodinidae which spread them out like the Geometridae.

Taxonomy 
This is one of the largest genera in the family Riodinidae. As of 2004 there were almost 170 species and more are being described continually. The type species of the genus is Euselasia gelon (Stoll, [1787]).

Species 
Species include:
Euselasia albomaculiga Callaghan, 1999 present in Colombia
Euselasia alcmena (H. Druce, 1878) present in Ecuador
Euselasia amblypodia Lathy, 1926 present in Peru
Euselasia amphidecta (Godman & Salvin, 1878) present in Costa Rica and Panama
Euselasia andreae Hall, Willmott & Busby, 1998 present in Ecuador
Euselasia angulata (Bates, 1868) present in Mexico, Costa Rica, Brazil and Colombia
Euselasia anica (Herrich-Schäffer, [1853]) present in Suriname
Euselasia arbas (Stoll, 1781) present in French Guiana, Guyana, Suriname and Colombia
Euselasia archelaus Seitz, 1916 present in Ecuador and Bolivia
Euselasia argentea (Hewitson, 1871) present in Mexico, Nicaragua, Bolivia and Colombia
Euselasia artos (Herrich-Schäffer, [1853]) present in Suriname
Euselasia athena (Hewitson, 1869) present in Ecuador
Euselasia attrita Seitz, 1916 present in Bolivia
Euselasia aurantia (Butler & H. Druce, 1872) present in Panama, Costa Rica and Colombia
Euselasia aurantiaca (Salvin & Godman, 1868) present in Panama, Costa Rica, Nicaragua, Venezuela and Colombia
Euselasia authe (Godman, 1903) present in Brazil and Peru
Euselasia baucis Stichel, 1919 present in Colombia and Peru
Euselasia bettina (Hewitson, 1869) present in Costa Rica, Nicaragua and Ecuador
Euselasia bilineata Lathy, 1926 present in French Guiana
Euselasia brevicauda Lathy, 1926 present in Bolivia
Euselasia cafusa (Bates, 1868) present in French Guiana, Guyana, Suriname, Trinidad and Tobago, Ecuador and Brazil
Euselasia calligramma (Bates, 1868) present in Brazil
Euselasia candaria (H. Druce, 1904) present in Colombia
Euselasia cataleuca (R. Felder, 1869) present in Mexico
Euselasia catoleuce (Hübner, 1823)
Euselasia charilis (Bates, 1868) present in Colombia and Brazil
Euselasia chinguala Hall & Willmott, 1995 present in Ecuador
Euselasia chrysippe (Bates, 1866) present in Guatemala, Nicaragua, Costa Rica, Panama, and Colombia
Euselasia clesa (Hewitson, 1856) present in Brazil
Euselasia clithra (Bates, 1868) present in Brazil
Euselasia corduena (Hewitson, 1874) present in Panama, Costa Rica, Bolivia, Peru and Colombia
Euselasia crinon Stichel, 1919 present in Bolivia and Peru
Euselasia cucuta (Schaus, 1902) present in Venezuela
Euselasia cuprea Lathy, 1926 present in French Guiana
Euselasia cyanira Callaghan, 1997 present in Peru
Euselasia cyanofusa Hall & Willmott, 1998 present in Ecuador and Peru
Euselasia dolichos Staudinger, [1887]
Euselasia dorina (Hewitson, 1860) present in Brazil.
Euselasia fervida (Butler, 1874) present in Venezuela, Colombia and Brazil
Euselasia eberti Callaghan, 1999 present in Brazil
Euselasia effima (Hewitson, 1869) present in Ecuador
Euselasia ella Seitz, 1916 present in Bolivia, Colombia and Brazil
Euselasia erilis Stichel, 1919 present in Brazil
Euselasia ethemon (Cramer, 1776)
Euselasia euboea (Hewitson, [1853]) present in French Guiana, Guyana, Suriname, Venezuela, Bolivia and Brazil
Euselasia eubule (R. Felder, 1869) present in Mexico, Costa Rica and Panama
Euselasia eucerus (Hewitson, 1872) present in Brazil
Euselasia eucrates (Hewitson, 1872)present in Panama, Costa Rica, Ecuador, Venezuela and Colombia
Euselasia eucritus (Hewitson, [1853]) present in Bolivia and Brazil
Euselasia eugeon (Hewitson, 1856) - Eugeon sombermark - present in Brazil, Bolivia and Argentina
Euselasia euhemerus (Hewitson, 1856) present in Brazil
Euselasia eulione (Hewitson, 1856) present in Brazil
Euselasia eumedia (Hewitson, [1853]) present in Suriname and Brazil
Euselasia eumenes (Hewitson, [1853]) present in Brazil
Euselasia eumithres Stichel, 1919 present in Brazil
Euselasia eunaeus (Hewitson, [1855]) Brazil
Euselasia euodias (Hewitson, 1856) present in French Guiana and Brazil
Euselasia euoras (Hewitson, [1855]) present in French Guiana, Bolivia, Ecuador, Brazil and Peru
Euselasia eupatra Seitz, 1916 present in Colombia
Euselasia euphaes (Hewitson, [1855]) present in Brazil and Peru
Euselasia euploea (Hewitson, [1855]) present in Brazil
Euselasia euriteus (Cramer, 1777) present in Suriname and Brazil
Euselasia euromus (Hewitson, 1856) present in Brazil
Euselasia eurymachus (Hewitson, 1872) present in Ecuador
Euselasia euryone (Hewitson, 1856) present in French Guiana, Guyana, Suriname, Ecuador, Brazil, Peru and Bolivia
Euselasia eurypus (Hewitson, 1856) present in Brazil
Euselasia erythraea (Bates, 1868) present in Colombia and Brazil
Euselasia eusepus (Hewitson, [1853]) present in Mexico and Brazil
Euselasia eutaea (Hewitson, [1853]) present in Suriname and Brazil
Euselasia eustola Stichel, 1919 present in French Guiana, Peru and Bolivia
Euselasia eutychus (Hewitson, 1856) present in Guyana, Colombia and Brazil
Euselasia extensa Bates, 1968 present in Brazil
Euselasia fabia (Godman, 1903) present in Ecuador and Peru
Euselasia fournierae Lathy, 1924 present in Brazil
Euselasia gelanor (Stoll, 1780) present in French Guiana, Suriname and Bolivia
Euselasia gelon (Stoll, [1787]) present in Suriname and Bolivia
Euselasia geon Seitz, 1913 present in Brazil, Bolivia and Argentina
Euselasia gordios Stichel, 1919 present in Bolivia
Euselasia gradata Stichel, 1927 present in Venezuela
Euselasia gyda (Hewitson, 1860) present in Panama, Costa Rica, Colombia, Brazil and Bolivia
Euselasia hahneli Staudinger, [1887] present in Peru
Euselasia hieronymi (Salvin & Godman, 1868) present in Mexico, Panama, Costa Rica, Guatemala, Nicaragua and Ecuador
Euselasia hygenius (Stoll, 1787) present in Suriname and Brazil
Euselasia hypophaea (Godman & Salvin, 1878) present in Panama
Euselasia ignitus Stichel, 1924 present in French Guiana and Brazil
Euselasia illarina Hall & Willmott, 1998 present in Ecuador
Euselasia inconspicua (Godman & Salvin, 1878) present in Panama and Colombia
Euselasia inini Brévignon, 1996 present in French Guiana
Euselasia issoria (Hewitson, 1869) present in Ecuador
Euselasia janigena Stichel, 1919 present in Peru
Euselasia jigginsi Hall & Willmott, 1998 present in Ecuador
Euselasia jocotoco
Euselasia julia (H. Druce, 1878) present in Brazil
Euselasia kartopus Stichel, 1919 present in French Guiana, Bolivia and Peru
Euselasia labdacus (Stoll, 1780) present in Suriname, Panama, Costa Rica, Venezuela and Colombia
Euselasia leucon (Schaus, 1913) present in Panama and Costa Rica
Euselasia leucophryna (Schaus, 1913) present in Costa Rica
Euselasia lisias (Cramer, [1777]) present in French Guiana, Guyana, Suriname and Colombia
Euselasia lycaeus Staudinger, 1888 present in Brazil
Euselasia lysimachus Staudinger, 1888 present in Brazil
Euselasia manoa Brévignon, 1996 present in French Guiana
Euselasia mapatayana Hall & Willmott, 1998 present in Ecuador and Colombia
Euselasia matuta (Schaus, 1913) present in Costa Rica
Euselasia mazaca (Hewitson, 1860) present in Brazil
Euselasia melaphaea (Hübner, 1823) present in Suriname, Bolivia and Brazil
Euselasia micaela (Schaus, 1902) present in Peru
Euselasia midas (Fabricius, 1775) present in Panama, Costa Rica, French Guiana, Guyana, Suriname, Colombia, Bolivia and Peru
Euselasia mirania (Bates, 1868) present in Brazil
Euselasia modesta (Bates, 1868) present in Brazil and Argentina
Euselasia murina Stichel, 1925 present in Brazil
Euselasia mutator Seitz, 1916 present in Peru
Euselasia mys (Herrich-Schäffer, [1853]) present in Suriname and Brazil
Euselasia mystica (Schaus, 1913) present in Costa Rica
Euselasia nauca Hall & Willmott, 1998 present in Ecuador
Euselasia nytua
Euselasia oaxacensis
Euselasia onorata (Hewitson, 1869) present in Ecuador, Costa Rica and Colombia
Euselasia opalescens (Hewitson, [1855]) present in French Guiana, Bolivia, Ecuador, Brazil and Peru
Euselasia opalina (Westwood, 1851) present in Brazil
Euselasia opimia Stichel, 1919 present in Bolivia
Euselasia orba Stichel, 1919 present in Brazil
Euselasia orion Le Cerf, 1958 present in Colombia
Euselasia orfita (Cramer, 1777) present in French Guiana, Guyana, Suriname, Ecuador, Bolivia and Brazil
Euselasia palla Hall & Willmott, 1998 present in Ecuador
Euselasia pance Callaghan, 1999 present in Colombia
Euselasia parca Stichel, 1919 present in Brazil
Euselasia pellonia Stichel, 1919 present in Brazil and Peru
Euselasia pelor (Hewitson, [1853]) present in Brazil
Euselasia pellos Stichel, 1919 present in Brazil
Euselasia perisama Hall & Lamas, 2001 present in Peru
Euselasia phedica (Boisduval, [1836]) present in French Guiana
Euselasia phelina (H. Druce, 1878) present in French Guiana, Venezuela, Brazil and Peru
Euselasia pillaca Hall & Willmott, 1998 present in Ecuador
Euselasia portentosa Stichel, 1927 present in Costa Rica
Euselasia praecipua Stichel, 1924 present in Brazil and French Guiana
Euselasia praeclara (Hewitson, 1869) present in Ecuador
Euselasia procula (Godman & Salvin, [1885]) present in Mexico, Panama and Costa Rica
Euselasia pseudomys Callaghan, 1999 present in Brazil
Euselasia pullata Stichel, 1927 present in Brazil
Euselasia pusilla (R. Felder, 1869) present in Mexico
Euselasia rasonea (Schaus, 1902) present in Venezuela and Colombia
Euselasia rava Stichel, 1928 present in Peru
Euselasia regipennis (Butler & H. Druce, 1872) present in Mexico and Colombia
Euselasia rhodogyne (Godman, 1903) present in Panama, Costa Rica, Ecuador and Colombia
Euselasia rhodon Seitz, 1913 present in Brazil
Euselasia rubrocilia Lathy, 1926 present in French Guiana
Euselasia saulina Brévignon, 1996 present in French Guiana
Euselasia scotinosa Stichel, 1930 present in French Guiana and Brazil
Euselasia seitzi Lathy, 1926 present in Peru
Euselasia serapis Stichel, 1919 present in Brazil
Euselasia sergia (Godman & Salvin, [1885]) present in United States (east coast), Mexico, Panama, Guatemala and Costa Rica
Euselasia subargentea (Lathy, 1904) present in Costa Rica and Colombia
Euselasia tarinta (Schaus, 1902) present in Colombia
Euselasia teleclus (Stoll, 1787) present in French Guiana, Suriname and Ecuador
Euselasia thaumata Hall & Willmott, 1998 present in Ecuador
Euselasia thucydides (Fabricius, 1793) present in Brazil
Euselasia thusnelda Möschler, 1883 present in Suriname
Euselasia toppini Sharpe, 1915 present in Colombia, Bolivia, Brazil and Peru
Euselasia uria (Hewitson, [1853]) present in Brazil
Euselasia urites (Hewitson, [1853]) present in French Guiana and Brazil
Euselasia utica (Hewitson, [1855]) present in Brazil
Euselasia uzita (Hewitson, [1853]) present in French Guiana, Guyana, Suriname and Brazil
Euselasia venezolana Seitz, 1913 present in French Guiana, Venezuela and Colombia
Euselasia violacea Lathy, 1924 present in Colombia
Euselasia violetta (Bates, 1868) present in Brazil and French Guiana
Euselasia waponaka Brévignon, 1996 present in French Guiana
Euselasia zara (Westwood, 1851) present in Brazil
Euselasia zena (Hewitson, 1860) present in French Guiana, Colombia, Brazil and Peru

References

External links 

Euselasia at Butterflies of America
images representing Euselasia at Encyclopedia of Life

Bibliography 
 Christian Brévignon, le groupe d'Eusalia euoras, Lépidoptères de Guyane tomme III, 

Riodinidae
Riodinidae of South America
Butterfly genera
Taxa named by Jacob Hübner